Noland may refer to:

Noland (surname)
Noland (Oz), a fictional region near the Land of Oz
Noland Bay, an Australian body of water
Noland (Pokémon), a character in Pokémon Emerald and Pokémon Platinum video games

Dans le Manga One Piece écrit pas Echiro oda le nom Noland est évoqué comme un conte originaire de North Blue